A Chess Dispute is a 1903 British short black-and-white silent comedy film, directed by Robert W. Paul, starring Alfred Collins. It is included on the BFI DVD R.W. Paul: The Collected Films 1895-1908.

Release 
The film was released on August 31, 1903.

Plot 
The movies depicts a stationary camera which looks on as two dapper gents play a game of chess. One drinks and smokes, and when he looks away, his opponent moves two pieces. A comedic fight ensues, first with the squirting of a soda siphon, then with each punching the other. The opponents wrestle each other to the floor and continue the fight out of the camera's view, hidden by the table. The waiter then arrives to haul them out of the hotel.

References

External links

British black-and-white films
British silent short films
Films about chess
1903 comedy films
1903 films
1903 short films
1903 in chess
British comedy short films
Films directed by Robert W. Paul
Silent comedy films